O Semideus (Portuguese: The Demigod) is a Brazilian telenovela produced and broadcast by TV Globo. It premiered on 22 August 1973 and ended on 7 May 1974, with a total of 221 episodes in Black and white. It's the thirteenth "novela das oito" to be aired on the timeslot. It is created and written by Janete Clair and directed by Walter Avancini and Daniel Filho.

Cast 
 Tarcísio Meira - Hugo Leonardo / Raul de Paula
 Glória Menezes - Ângela
 Francisco Cuoco - Alex Garcia
 Maria Cláudia - Estela
 Juca de Oliveira - Alberto Parreiras
 Yoná Magalhães - Adriana Penha
 Nívea Maria - Soninha
 Ziembinski - Padre Miodek
 Yara Cortes - Sula
 Miriam Pires - Dulce Leonardo
 Felipe Carone - Gildo Graça
 Paulo Padilha - Dr. Lafayette Pontes
 Monah Delacy - Santa
 Ary Fontoura - Mauro
 Stênio Garcia - Lorde José
 Renata Fronzi - Paloma
 Antônio Patiño - Horácio
 Mary Daniel - Joyce
 Castro Gonzaga - Azevedo
 Gracinda Freire - Juventina
 Ênio Santos - Santana
 Macedo Neto - Dr. Fausto
 Ana Ariel - Clara
 Jardel Mello - Dr. Paulo
 Ângela Leal - Carmem
 Ivan Cândido - Wálter
 Heloísa Helena - Elza
 Irma Alvarez - Rachel
 Carlos Duval - Almeida
 Roberto Faissal - Januário
 Hemílcio Fróes - Quinzinho (Joaquim)
 Lúcia Alves - Beatriz
 Tony Ferreira - Telmo
 Suzana Gonçalves - Norma (Norminha)
 Rodolfo Arena - Osvaldo
 Roberto Bomfim - Carlos
 Françoise Forton - Wanda
 Maria Cristina Nunes - Leda
 Paulo Ramos - Dr. Renato
 Roberto Pirillo - Lulu
 Denise Dumont - Analu (Ana Lúcia)
 Diogo Vilela - Diogo
 Glória Pires - Ione
 Júlio César Vieira - Manuel (Maneco)
 Rosana Garcia - Carmem (Carminha)
 Isabela Garcia - Clara (Clarinha)
 Sérgio de Oliveira - Abílio
 Marcele Russo - Durvalina
 Sérgio Mansur - Ruy Reis
 Mário Petráglia - Juca

References

External links 
 

TV Globo telenovelas
1973 telenovelas
Brazilian telenovelas
1973 Brazilian television series debuts
1974 Brazilian television series endings
Portuguese-language telenovelas